Leonardo "Léo" Fortunato dos Santos (born March 14, 1983 in Rio de Janeiro) is a Brazilian centre back who is equally adept as a defensive midfielder, currently playing for Tupi.

Honours 
 Taça Rio: 2006
 Campeonato Mineiro: 2008

Contract 
 25 April 2007 to 24 April 2009
 Vitória: One-year contracts since January 2011

References

External links 
  Léo Fortunato at Footballzz
  CBF
  zerozero.pt
  Guardian Stats Centre

1983 births
Living people
Brazilian footballers
Madureira Esporte Clube players
Olaria Atlético Clube players
Bangu Atlético Clube players
Cruzeiro Esporte Clube players
Esporte Clube Vitória players
S.C. Braga players
Brazilian expatriate footballers
Expatriate footballers in Portugal
Association football defenders
Footballers from Rio de Janeiro (city)